"Rebel Never Gets Old" is a mash-up of the songs "Rebel Rebel" and "Never Get Old", where the two songs are mixed into each other, produced by producer Mark Vidler, also known as Go Home Productions. It was released as a rare single, following some copies of Reality in Europe in 2004. The "Radio Mix" had already been available as an iTunes download before a promo single was released. The single eventually officially appeared as a CD-single, a 12" vinyl version and a 12" vinyl picture disc, but for some reason the first two were very difficult to obtain. The single nevertheless peaked at #47 in the UK charts in June 2004.

Track listing

CD: ISO-Columbia / COL 674971 (EU) 

 "Rebel Never Gets Old" (Radio Mix) 3:25
 "Rebel Never Gets Old" (7th Heaven Edit) 4:19
 "Rebel Never Gets Old" (7th Heaven Mix)
 "Days" (Album version)

Other releases
 The "7th Heaven Edit", which was labelled "Extended Edit" on the promo, is also available on the Digital Beauties.001 compilation.

David Bowie songs
2004 singles
Songs written by David Bowie
2004 songs
Columbia Records singles